Carrignavar GAA is a Gaelic Athletic Association club located in the village of Carrignavar, County Cork, Ireland. The club fields teams in both hurling and Gaelic football.

Honours

 East Cork Junior A Football Championship (1): 1975
 East Cork Junior A Hurling Championship (2): 2008, 2012

External links
Carraig na bhFear GAA site

Gaelic games clubs in County Cork
Gaelic football clubs in County Cork
Hurling clubs in County Cork